Ladislav Nagy (born 1 June 1979) is a Slovak former professional ice hockey player. He played eight seasons as a left winger in the National Hockey League (NHL) with the St. Louis Blues, Phoenix Coyotes, Dallas Stars, and Los Angeles Kings.

Early life
Nagy was born into an ethnically Hungarian family in Šaca, (borough of Košice, then in Czechoslovakia) on 1 June 1979.

Career
As a youth, Nagy played in the 1993 Quebec International Pee-Wee Hockey Tournament with a team from Poprad. He began his career in 1995 as a junior by HC Košice in the Slovak Extraliga. He was drafted 177th overall in the 1997 NHL Entry Draft by the St. Louis Blues. After being drafted Nagy came to North America and played with the Halifax Mooseheads on the QMJHL for the 1998–99 season and was named the fans 7th most popular player during the 15 year celebrations.

Nagy made his professional debut in the AHL playoffs later that year with the Worcester Ice Cats. Nagy played with the Blues then from 1999 to 2001, and was traded to the Coyotes with Michal Handzus, Jeff Taffe and a first round pick in the 2002 draft in exchange for Keith Tkachuk. During his time with the Coyotes, Nagy posted 3 straight 20+ goal seasons from 2001 to 2004, and notched 50 points from 2002–03 to 2005–06. However, his goal and point production would quickly decline in the latter season.

On February 12, 2007, Nagy was traded to the Dallas Stars for winger Mathias Tjärnqvist and a first-round pick in the 2007 NHL Entry Draft.  On July 2, 2007, Nagy signed with the Los Angeles Kings, after coming off a disappointing stint in Dallas. However Ladislav was limited to only 38 games during the 2007–08 season due to injury.

On August 18, 2008 Nagy signed with Cherepovets of the Russian Kontinental Hockey League for two years worth 5.6 million. Nagy intended to use this time to get back to the NHL by regaining his form and health.

In December 2010, Nagy signed for Swedish strugglers Modo Hockey for the rest of the season, joining compatriot Ľuboš Bartečko at the club. On August 1, 2013, Nagy returned to his original club in Slovakia, HC Košice, on a one-year deal for the 2013–14 season.

Nagy played his last professional season in 2018–19, ending his 23-year career in his homeland with Slovakia as the hosts of the 2019 World Championships. In his final competitive game, Nagy captained Slovakia and scored the shootout winning goal over Denmark on 21 May 2019.

Career statistics

Regular season and playoffs
Bold indicates led league

International

Awards and honours

References

External links
 
 
 
 

1979 births
Living people
Dallas Stars players
HC Dinamo Minsk players
HK Dukla Michalovce players
Halifax Mooseheads players
HC Košice players
HC Lev Poprad players
Jokerit players
Los Angeles Kings players
HK Poprad players
Modo Hockey players
Mora IK players
Ice hockey players at the 2018 Winter Olympics
Olympic ice hockey players of Slovakia
Sportspeople from Košice
Phoenix Coyotes players
St. Louis Blues draft picks
St. Louis Blues players
Severstal Cherepovets players
Slovak ice hockey left wingers
Slovak people of Hungarian descent
HC Slovan Bratislava players
Worcester IceCats players
Expatriate ice hockey players in Belarus
Slovak expatriate ice hockey players in Russia
Slovak expatriate ice hockey players in the United States
Slovak expatriate ice hockey players in Finland
Slovak expatriate sportspeople in Belarus
Slovak expatriate ice hockey players in Sweden
Slovak expatriate ice hockey players in Canada